Juana María Vallejo Klaere is an Ecuadorian television producer and politician. She was elected Governor of Guayas Province in 2018.

Career
In the latter of these two, she founded the Civic Management Foundation, which she used to build schools, shelters, and day care centers, gradually expanding the influence of the Foundation over other barrios of Guayaquil. However, her candidacy gave her a media platform that Vallejo used to created public service announcements and hold talk shows.

In 1988, President Rodrigo Borja Cevallos appointed Vallejos  at a time when the Province was experiencing high levels of crime and violence. However, she would resign in the same year following disagreements over leadership with the President's party, the Democratic Left.

Primary objectives of her term was the establishment of measures and legislature designed at protecting the Galapagos Islands and the increasing of investment of hotel chains in Ecuador.

In 2002, she won a seat in the Andean Parliament for the Social Christian Party from 2003 to 2007, later becoming the vice president of the Parliament. In 2007, Vallejo made an unsuccessful bid to be elected to the Ecuadorian Constituent Assembly.

Citations

Living people
Government ministers of Ecuador
Governors of Guayas Province
Women government ministers of Ecuador
Year of birth missing (living people)
Women governors of provinces of Ecuador
Provincial Prefects of Ecuador
21st-century Ecuadorian women politicians
21st-century Ecuadorian politicians